Forsgate is a golf course community and census-designated place (CDP) in Monroe Township, Middlesex County, New Jersey, United States. It consists of Forsgate Country Club and its associated housing developments. It is in the northwestern part of the township, bordered to the south across Forsgate Drive by Rossmoor, to the east by the Hightstown Industrial Track rail line, to the north by a branch rail line connecting Jamesburg and Monmouth Junction, and to the west by the New Jersey Turnpike at Exit 8A.

The community was first listed as a CDP prior to the 2020 census.

Demographics

References 

Census-designated places in Middlesex County, New Jersey
Census-designated places in New Jersey
Monroe Township, Middlesex County, New Jersey